Levert, also spelled Le Vert, is an unincorporated community in Perry County, Alabama, United States. Levert lies entirely within the Oakmulgee District of the Talladega National Forest. A post office operated under the name Le Vert from 1881 to 1905.

References

Unincorporated communities in Perry County, Alabama
Unincorporated communities in Alabama